WBUL may refer to:

 WBUL (AM), a student radio station (1620 AM) located in Tampa, Florida, United States
 WBUL-FM, a radio station (98.1 FM) licensed to Lexington, Kentucky, United States